Jin Hyung-wook is a South Korean television producer and director.

Filmography

As TV producer
 This is Love (KBS2, 2001)
 Nine Tailed Fox (KBS2, 2004)
 Empress Cheonchu (KBS2, 2009)
 My Lawyer, Mr. (KBS2.2016)

As TV director
 When Spring Comes (KBS2, 2007)
 The Innocent Woman (KBS2, 2007)
 Three Brothers (KBS2, 2009-2010)
 My One and Only (KBS1, 2011-2012)
 Wang's Family (KBS2, 2013-2014)
 You Are the Only One (KBS1, 2014-2015)
 The Secret of My Love (KBS2, 2017)
 Liver or Die (KBS2, 2019)
 Born Again (KBS2, 2020)
 Red Balloon (TV Chosun, 2022)

References

External links 
 
 

Living people
South Korean television directors
South Korean television producers
1969 births